This is a list of transactions that have taken place during the off-season and the 2021 WNBA season.

Retirement

Front office movements

Head coach changes
Off-season

Player movement

Trades

Free agency

Waived

References

Transactions